1991 is a Canadian comedy-drama film, directed by Ricardo Trogi and released in 2018. The third film in his semi-autobiographical series after 1981 and 1987, the film centres on Ricardo's (Jean-Carl Boucher) 1991 trip to Italy to pursue a relationship with Marie-Ève (Juliette Gosselin).

The film finished 2018 as the year's top-grossing Canadian film, and was named the winner of the Golden Screen Award at the 7th Canadian Screen Awards. It received 16 Prix Iris nominations at the 21st Quebec Cinema Awards, including Best Film.

Plot 
In 1991, Ricardo Trogi is 21 and studies cinema at UQAM in Montréal. His friend and “the woman of his life”, Marie-Ève Bernard, invites him to go in Italy to study Italian in Perugia. Determined, Ricardo accepts without hesitation.

After landing in Paris, Ricardo rides a train to Perugia, where he meets Arturo, a stowaway who earns his living by playing Like a Rolling Stone on guitar in the streets. On arrival, failing to find Marie-Ève, Ricardo accidentally loses his passport, money and letter of acceptance to the University of Perugia. Ricardo goes to the Canadian Embassy in Rome to get a new passport and emergency funds. In the meantime, he is unable to check into any hotel without a passport. While spending the night at the train station, he meets Arturo a second time.

Back in Perugia the next day, and having already missed two days of school, Ricardo is assigned an apartment with Mamadou, who is from Burkina Faso. After partying all night, Ricardo wakes up besides a Greek woman named Yorda. The next morning, Marie-Ève shows up, and explains she is sharing an apartment with Raphi, a Spanish student, with whom she leaves on a field trip to Florence. Ricardo stumbles upon Arturo once again and continues to see Yorda even though he still has feelings for Marie-Ève, only to catch her having sex with Raphi.

Ricardo confronts Marie-Ève about how he feels. He explains he only came for her and he doesn't care about anything else in Italy, that no ordinary friends would do this. Marie-Ève rejects his feelings kindly but Ricardo, tired, heart-broken and disgusted leaves without a word, leaving Marie-Ève feeling bad. The next morning, he decides to leave Perugia for good, but Yorda catches him and says a heartfelt goodbye, during which it is revealed her name was actually Georgia. On the train, Ricardo stumbles upon Arturo one last time while imagining Marie-Ève singing Like A Rolling Stone.

Accolades

References

External links
 

2018 films
2018 comedy-drama films
Canadian comedy-drama films
2010s French-language films
Films directed by Ricardo Trogi
Films set in 1991
Films set in Italy
Works about Italian-Canadian culture
Best Film Prix Iris winners
French-language Canadian films
2010s Canadian films